The Bolivian Chess Championship is organized by the Bolivian Chess Federation.

Winners since 2000

{| class="sortable wikitable"
! Year !! Champion
!Woman Champion
|-
| 2000 || 
|
|-
| 2001 ||Jonny Cueto
|
|-
| 2002 || Oswaldo Zambrana
|
|-
| 2003 ||Oswaldo Zambrana
|
|-
| 2004 ||Alfredo Cruz
|
|-
| 2005 ||Jorge Berrocal
|
|-
| 2006 ||Oswaldo Zambrana
|
|-
| 2007 ||Ronald Campero
|
|-
| 2008 || 
|
|-
| 2009 ||Ronald Campero
|
|-
| 2010 ||Boris Ferrufino
|
|-
| 2011 ||Oswaldo Zambrana
|
|-
| 2012 || Jose Daniel Gemy
|
|-
| 2013 ||Jose Daniel Gemy
|
|-
| 2014 ||Oswaldo Zambrana
|
|-
| 2015 ||Jose Daniel Gemy
|Suely Bastos
|- 
| 2016 ||Jose Daniel Gemy
|
|-
|2017
|Jose Daniel Gemy
|
|-
|2018
|
|
|-
|2019
|
|
|-
|2020
|Jose Daniel Gemy
|Jessica Molina
|}

Notes

References

Chess in Bolivia
Chess national championships
Sports competitions in Bolivia